The Fram Islands are a small group of rocky islands and rocks in the western portion of the Geologie Archipelago,  north-northwest of Cape Geodesie. They were photographed from the air by U.S. Navy Operation Highjump, 1946–47, charted by the French Antarctic Expedition, 1949–51, and named by them for the Norwegian polar ship Fram, used by Fridtjof Nansen in the Arctic and Roald Amundsen in the Antarctic.

See also 
 List of Antarctic and sub-Antarctic islands

References 

Islands of Adélie Land